Dreamslayer is a fictional character, a powerful DC Comics supervillain and part of the evil gang called Extremists. Like the other Extremists, he is an homage to a Marvel Comics character, in this case Dormammu. He first appeared in Justice League Europe #15 (June 1990), and was created by Keith Giffen, Gerard Jones and Bart Sears.

Fictional character biography
Originally, it had been thought Dreamslayer was simply a robotic version of a previous living entity, like his comrades, but it turned out he was real, or at least his mind was. As part of the group, Dreamslayer killed most of the people on Angor, his alternate Earth. He follows along to Earth with the four surviving humans of his world, Mitch Wacky, Wandjina, Silver Sorceress and Blue Jay. He possesses Maxwell Lord. He kidnaps Mitch Wacky, the brilliant inventor who had created the robots of his comrades. Wacky is taken to the mobile island of Kooey Kooey Kooey, whose people Dreamslayer had mentally enslaved through Maxwell Lord. Wacky, who wasn't healthy to begin with, was forced to work around the clock on the robotic extremists. He was only able to repair Lord Havok due to limited supplies. As soon as Havok was functional, Dreamslayer snaps Wacky's neck.

The Silver Sorceress attacks the island, along with her Justice League comrades. The natives of the island, mentally controlled by Dreamslayer, attack. The League's desire to not hurt the innocent natives costs the Sorceress her life, as she is hit with an arrow in the stomach. Before dying, she neutralizes Dreamslayer in a mystical battle. He has returned more than once, to plague Supergirl and the Justice League. He was used and tricked by the villain Overmaster. He was also seen in the JLA/Avengers crossover, targeting Hawkeye and Flash with a bolt of energy.

Other versions
The Countdown Presents: Lord Havok and the Extremists mini-series depicts the actions of the alternate universe Dreamslayer of Earth 8. Following the return of the DC Multiverse, another universe's version of Lord Havok and the Extremists are based on Earth-8. In this version, Dreamslayer is the self-proclaimed god of his own religion, Dreamology. In #4 of Lord Havok and the Extremists, Dreamslayer is revealed to be a demon, who gathered followers to honor him and bring forth a suitable host vessel. Dreamslayer possessed a man called Louie Marino, and proceeded to kill his followers, before a cloaked man (later revealed to be Lord Havok) cast a spell to weaken him. The man transferred Dreamslayer out of Louie's body and into the body of his sister Louise Marino, in the hopes that her stronger mind could keep the demon at bay. Louise has been in a relationship with her fellow Extremist Tracer.

JLA/Avengers
Dreamslayer is among the enthralled villains defending Krona's stronghold when the heroes assault it in #4. He apparently kills the Barry Allen Flash and Hawkeye, and is then blasted apart by a vengeful Green Lantern.

Powers and abilities
Dreamslayer is a supernatural being or powerful sorcerer whose magic is drawn from the dimension of terrors which he rules over. He has superhuman strength and endurance, immunity to physical and energy attacks, can fly, project flame, teleport, read minds, communicate with telepathy, and manipulate matter. He is a wraith-like being that is unlikely to be killed by conventional means, even surviving the nuclear event on Angor. When taking over a person's body, he can supercharge any metahuman abilities they have, like with Maxwell Lord, enabling him to control thousands of minds at once. 

The Earth-8 version of Dreamslayer has the same magical abilities, including the power to freeze a whole city in time.

In other media
 Dreamslayer makes a short appearance in the Justice League Unlimited episode "Shadow of the Hawk", voiced by John DiMaggio. He appears alongside the other Extremists fighting the Justice League in Gotham City, but is defeated by Green Lantern.

References

External links
 DCU Guide: Dreamslayer

DC Comics demons
DC Comics supervillains 
DC Comics characters who can teleport
DC Comics characters who use magic
DC Comics characters with superhuman strength
DC Comics deities 
DC Comics characters who have mental powers
DC Comics telekinetics 
DC Comics telepaths
Fictional characters with spirit possession or body swapping abilities 
Fictional characters with fire or heat abilities 
Fictional characters with slowed ageing
Fictional characters with elemental transmutation abilities
Comics characters introduced in 1990
Characters created by Keith Giffen